The Storm 320E, sometimes written Storm 320 E, is an Italian microlight aircraft that was designed and produced by Storm Aircraft of Sabaudia. Storm Aircraft was originally called SG Aviation srl. When it was available the aircraft was supplied as a kit for amateur construction.

Design and development
Designed for the Fédération Aéronautique Internationale European microlight class, the Storm 320E features a cantilever low-wing, a two-seats-in-side-by-side configuration enclosed cockpit under a forward-hinged bubble canopy, fixed tricycle landing gear with wheel pants, and a single engine in tractor configuration. A conventional landing gear version is designated the Storm 280.

The aircraft is made from aluminum sheet with some fibreglass parts. The wing planform is rectangular, but the ailerons taper outboard, giving an overall tapered result.

The manufacturer estimated the construction time from the supplied kit as 400 hours or 250 hours from the quick-build kit.

Operational history
By 1998 the company reported that 100 of the 280 and 320E model kits combined had been sold and 70 aircraft were completed and flying.

Variants
Storm 320E
Tricycle landing gear version
Storm 280
Conventional landing gear version

Specifications (Storm 320E)

References

External links
Photo of Storm 320E
Photo of Storm 280

320E
1990s Italian sport aircraft
1990s Italian ultralight aircraft
1990s Italian civil utility aircraft
Single-engined tractor aircraft
Low-wing aircraft
Homebuilt aircraft